The following is a timeline of the COVID-19 pandemic in Beijing for the year 2021.

January

On January 1, Nancai Village, Nancai Town, Shunyi District, was adjusted to a medium-risk area.Xu Hejian, the spokesperson of the Beijing Municipal Government, said that during the epidemic prevention and control period, new recruits must hold a valid nucleic acid test certificate for 3 days.Shunyi District announced the suspension of all gathering commercial activities, prohibiting group dinners, annual meetings, and other activities, and suspending the opening of theaters, swimming pools, and other places where people gather to prevent people from gathering.On the same day, 1 new local confirmed case was added in Beijing.

On January 3, 2 new local confirmed cases and 1 asymptomatic infection were added in Beijing.

On January 4, 1 new local confirmed case was added in Beijing.

On January 5, Xu Hejian, Deputy Director of the Propaganda Department of the Beijing Municipal Party Committee, Director of the Municipal Government Information Office, and Municipal Government Spokesperson announced that the capital's strict entry into Beijing management, joint prevention, control, and coordination mechanism had decided to implement "14+7" health management for people entering Beijing. On the same day, Beijing added 1 new local confirmed case, no new suspected cases and asymptomatic infections; no new imported confirmed cases, suspected cases and asymptomatic infections; 1 case was cured and discharged.

On January 9, 1 new local confirmed case and 1 asymptomatic infection were added in Beijing, and 2 cases were cured and discharged.

On January 10, 1 new local confirmed case and 4 asymptomatic infections were added in Beijing, and 1 case was cured and discharged.

From January 11, Lianzhuang Village, Zhaoquanying Town, Shunyi District, had been upgraded to a medium-risk area. At the press conference that day, it was announced that the confirmed cases on January 9 concealed their itinerary, refused to cooperate with the flow investigation, and denied the trajectory information of relevant departments to assist in the investigation and verification, which had an extremely adverse impact on the prevention and control of the epidemic.Closed management was to be implemented in the rural areas of Shunyi District.On the same day, 1 new local confirmed case was added in Beijing.

On January 17, 2 new local confirmed cases (both located in Tiangongyuan Street, Daxing District) were added in Beijing, and 1 new imported confirmed case was added.

On January 19, there were 7 new local confirmed cases in Beijing (6 cases in Ronghui Community, Tiangongyuan Street, Daxing District, and 1 case in Nanxinzhuanghu Village, Beiwu Town, Shunyi District), and 2 cases were cured and discharged.

On January 21, Beijing added 3 new local confirmed cases (all in Ronghui Community, Tiangongyuan Street, Daxing District) and 1 asymptomatic infection, and 2 new imported asymptomatic infections.

On January 22, Xizhaogezhuang Village, Beishicao Town, Shunyi District, was adjusted to a low-risk area.On the same day, there were 3 new local confirmed cases in Beijing (all in Ronghui Community, Tiangongyuan Street, Daxing District), and 1 case was cured and discharged.

On January 23, 2 new local confirmed cases were added in Beijing (both in Ronghui Community, Tiangongyuan Street, Daxing District).

On January 24, 3 new local confirmed cases were added in Beijing (all in Ronghui Community, Tiangongyuan Street, Daxing District).

On January 25, 2 new local confirmed cases were added in Beijing (both in Ronghui Community, Tiangongyuan Street, Daxing District), 2 cases were cured and discharged.

On January 26, 4 new local confirmed cases were added in Beijing (all in Ronghui Community, Tiangongyuan Street, Daxing District), and 4 cases were cured and discharged.

From January 27th, according to the requirements of the Beijing Municipal Government, passengers entering Beijing by direct flights from Hong Kong must hold a valid negative nucleic acid test result certificate issued by a local medical testing institution recognized by the Hong Kong Special Administrative Region Government within 7 days.At the 222nd regular press conference on epidemic prevention and control in Beijing, Xu Hejian, spokesperson of the Beijing Municipal Government, announced that personnel in medium- and high-risk areas and the entire region are subject to closed management and, in principle, cannot enter Beijing. Those who really need to enter Beijing must be approved by the local provincial epidemic prevention and control department, and have a negative nucleic acid test certificate within 72 hours. In addition, from January 28 to March 15, people from low-risk areas entering and returning to Beijing must hold a negative nucleic acid test certificate within 7 days before arriving in Beijing, and implement 14 days of health monitoring after arriving in Beijing, including a nucleic acid test.

On January 28, 1 local confirmed case and 1 suspected case were added in Beijing.

On January 29, 1 new local confirmed case was added in Beijing (in Ronghui Community, Tiangongyuan Street, Daxing District), and 3 cases were cured and discharged.Lianzhuang Village, Zhaoquanying Town, Shunyi District, and Beishicao Village, Beishicao Town, have been adjusted to low-risk areas.

On January 31, Beijing added 2 newly imported confirmed cases.

February
On February 1, 1 new imported confirmed case was added in Beijing.

On February 3, Beijing added 5 newly imported confirmed cases.

On February 6, 2 new imported confirmed cases were added in Beijing.From that day onwards, some communities (villages) in the Tiangongyuan area of Daxing District will be lifted from closed management.

On February 9, Ronghui Community, Tiangongyuan Street, Daxing District, was adjusted to a low-risk area. So far, all medium- and high-risk areas in Beijing have been cleared,Metro Tiangongyuan Station also resumed operations at 10 am the next day.

On February 21, one new imported confirmed case in Beijing was a Chinese tourist studying in Canada.

On February 28, 2 new imported confirmed cases were added in Beijing.

March
From 00:00 on March 16, people from low-risk areas in China no longer need to hold a negative nucleic acid test certificate within 7 days before arriving in Beijing. Carry out nucleic acid testing, hold a health pass code "green code", and enter and return to Beijing freely and orderly under the premise that the temperature measurement is normal and personal protection is done.

April

On April 2, 1 new imported confirmed case was added in Beijing, a passenger who entered from Canada.

On April 3, 1 new imported confirmed case was added in Beijing, the son of a newly confirmed case on 2 April; 1 case was cured and discharged, and all local confirmed cases treated in the hospital were cleared.

On April 4, 1 new imported confirmed case was added in Beijing, a passenger who entered from Sweden.

On April 6, 1 new imported confirmed case was added in Beijing, a passenger who entered from Sweden.

On April 8, 1 new imported confirmed case was added in Beijing, a passenger who entered from Greece.

On April 9, 1 new imported confirmed case was added in Beijing, a passenger who entered from Canada.

On April 10, one new imported confirmed case was added in Beijing, which was a close contact of the imported confirmed case on April 4.

On April 11, 1 newly imported confirmed case was imported from Hong Kong.

May
On May 22, 1 new imported confirmed case was added in Beijing, a passenger who entered from Sweden.

On May 26, one new imported confirmed case was added in Beijing, a passenger who entered from Zimbabwe.

June
On June 2, 1 new imported confirmed case was added in Beijing, a passenger who entered from Italy.

July
On July 12, 1 new imported confirmed case was added in Beijing, a passenger who entered from Greece.

August
On August 1, Beijing added 2 new confirmed cases of new coronary pneumonia related to outside Beijing and 1 case of asymptomatic infection, both of whom returned to Beijing from Zhangjiajie, Hunan Province, and came from the same family. On the same day, Beijing upgraded the prevention and control measures at Capital International Airport and Daxing International Airport. Improve the control level of entry into Beijing, strictly control the entry of people from medium and high-risk areas, restrict the entry of people from areas with cases of cases, and suspend flights, trains, and bus lines to Beijing. In addition, Beijing added 4 newly imported confirmed cases and 2 asymptomatic infections.

September
On September 4, Beijing added 1 new imported confirmed case.

October

On October 3, Beijing added 1 new imported confirmed case.

November

From 00:00 to 14:00 on November 1, a new local confirmed case of new coronary pneumonia was added in Beijing.On the same day, Chaoyang District was notified by the Changping Disease Control Department that the nucleic acid test results of two people in Changping District were positive and positive for a single gene, and their activities involved Huajiadi Experimental Primary School Chaolai Campus and Chen Jinglun Middle School Branch School.In addition, Beijing added 1 newly imported confirmed case and 1 asymptomatic infection.

December
On December 6, Beijing added 1 imported confirmed case and 1 imported asymptomatic infection.

On December 9, Beijing added 1 imported confirmed case and 1 imported asymptomatic infection.

On December 12, 2 newly imported confirmed cases in Beijing.

On December 16, 1 new imported confirmed case was added in Beijing.

On December 17, Beijing added 1 imported confirmed case and 1 imported asymptomatic infection.

On December 20, 1 new imported confirmed case was added in Beijing.

On December 25, Beijing added 1 imported case of asymptomatic infection transferred to a confirmed case and 1 case of asymptomatic infection.

On December 26, 2 new imported confirmed cases were added in Beijing.

On December 29, 1 new imported confirmed case was added in Beijing.

On December 31, 2 new imported confirmed cases in Beijing.

References

2021 in Beijing
zh:2019冠状病毒病北京市疫情时间线 (2021年)